Crystal City is the name of:

Places

Canada
 Crystal City, Manitoba, Canada

United States

 Crystal, Colorado
 Crystal City, Missouri
 Corning (city), New York, nicknamed the Crystal City due to its glass industry
 Crystal, North Dakota
 Crystal City, Texas
 Crystal City, Arlington, Virginia

Stations
 Crystal City station (VRE), a commuter rail station in Virginia
 Crystal City station (Washington Metro), a Washington Metro station in Virginia

Other
 The Crystal City, a 2003 novel by Orson Scott Card
 Crystal City, an alternate name for the Crystal Heights development proposed for Washington DC by Frank Lloyd Wright

See also
 
 Crystal Island (building project), a proposed supertall building project in Moscow, Russia